The 4th Jutra Awards were held on February 17, 2002 to honour films made with the participation of the Quebec film industry in 2001.

Winners and nominees

References

2002 in Quebec
Jutra
04
2001 in Canadian cinema